The Gravediggers (or Clowns) are examples of Shakespearean fools (also known as clowns or jesters), a recurring type of character in Shakespeare's plays.  Like most Shakespearean fools, the Gravediggers are peasants or commoners that use their great wit and intellect to get the better of their superiors, other people of higher social status, and each other.

The Gravediggers appear briefly in Shakespeare's tragedy Hamlet, making their only appearance at the beginning of Act V, scene i.  They are first encountered as they are digging a grave for the newly deceased Ophelia, discussing whether she deserves a Christian burial after having killed herself.  Soon, Hamlet enters and engages in a quick dialogue with the first Gravedigger.  The beat ends with Hamlet's speech regarding the circle of life prompted by his discovery of the skull of his father's beloved jester, Yorick.

Detailed summary
The penultimate scene of the play begins with the two clowns digging a grave for the late Ophelia.  They debate whether she should be allowed to have a Christian burial, because she committed suicide.  This quickly leads them into a discussion of the impact of politics on the decision, and the two parody lawyer speech.  They present Ophelia's case from both positions: if she jumped into the water, then she killed herself, but if the water effectively jumped on her, then she did not.  The First Gravedigger laments the fact that the wealthy have more freedom to commit suicide than the poor.

The pair get off the subject of suicide almost as quickly as they began it, however, and soon begins the more witty section of their scene.  The First Gravedigger begins to goad and test the Second, beginning by confusing him with the double meaning of the word "arms" (as in weapons and appendages).  The dialogue between the two ends when the First Gravedigger is unsatisfied by the answer to the riddle "What is he that builds stronger than either the mason, the shipwright, or the carpenter?" (V.i.39–40) that the Second Gravedigger gives, and consequently sends him off to bring back alcohol.

The Second Gravedigger exits as Hamlet and Horatio enter, and the First Gravedigger begins to sing a song on the topics of love and graves as he digs.  He throws a skull (and later a second) up and out of the grave.  Hamlet then talks to Horatio about how inappropriate it is to treat what used to be someone's, and possibly an important someone's, body in such a way.  He decides to ask the Gravedigger whose grave he is digging, but the Gravedigger will not reveal the answer without another witty exchange.

Soon, it is revealed that the Gravedigger has been digging graves since the day Hamlet was born.  The two then briefly discuss Hamlet's insanity (which they are able to do because the Gravedigger does not know Hamlet by sight).  It is shortly thereafter that the Gravedigger points out a skull that used to belong to Yorick, the king's jester and Hamlet's caretaker.  Hamlet asks if this could really be so, and the Gravedigger responds with, "E'en that," (V.i.159), marking his last line in the play.

Jokes

When together, the Gravediggers speak mainly in riddles and witty banter regarding death, with the first asking the questions and the second answering.

GravediggerWhat is he that builds stronger than either the mason, theshipwright, or the carpenter?
	
OtherThe gallows-maker, for that frame outlives a thousandtenants. (V.i., 38–41)

And later in the scene:

GravediggerAnd when you are askedthis question next, say “A grave-maker.” The houses thathe makes last till doomsday. (V.i., 53–55)

Songs

While digging Ophelia's grave, the first Gravedigger sings to himself:

GravediggerIn youth when I did love, did love,        Methought it was very sweetTo contract–o–the time, for–a–my behove,        Oh, methought, there–a–was nothing–a–meet. (V.i.57–58)

GravediggerBut age with his stealing steps        Hath clawed me in his clutch,And hath shipped me into the land        As if I had never been such.(throws up a skull) (V.i.63–64)

GravediggerA pickax and a spade, a spade,        For and a shrouding sheet,Oh, a pit of clay for to be made        For such a guest is meet.(throws up another skull) (V.i.95–98)

Note: this song is full of reworkings or misquotes from Thomas Vaux, 2nd Baron Vaux of Harrowden's poem. "The Aged Lover Renounceth Love"

Analysis of the scene 
 
Many important themes of the play are discussed and brought up by the Gravediggers in the short time they are on stage.  The manner in which these themes are presented, however, is notably different from the rest of the play.

While the rest of the play is set solely in the fictional world of Hamlet's Denmark, this scene helps make sense of the themes by simultaneously bringing the focus to the audience's world.  "By using recognizable references from contemporary times, the clown can, through the use of the oral tradition, make the audience understand the theme being played out by the court-dominated characters in the play."

For example, although the First Gravedigger is definitely in the fictional world of the play (he is digging Ophelia's grave), he also asks his fellow to "go, get thee to Yaughan, fetch me a stoup of liquor". This does not appear in all versions and means little to us now, but it is "generally supposed that [Yaughan] was a nearby inn-keeper [to the theatre]". Likewise, the First Gravedigger is in the same world as the English audience of the time when he jokes "...[insanity] will not be seen in [Hamlet] there [in England]; there the men are as mad as he". This gives enough of a distance from Elsinore [for the audience] to view what the clowns say as discreet parallels, not direct commentaries.

The literal graveness of the situation (the funeral) subsides to the humor.  This makes it possible for the characters to look at the subject of death objectively, giving rise to such speeches as Hamlet's musings over the skull of Yorick.

The tone is set from the opening of the scene, during the Gravediggers' dialogue regarding Ophelia.  Simply, they use her death to debate whether suicide is legitimate and forgivable according to religious law.  This is not the first time, however, that this question has been raised in the play.  Hamlet has the very same discussion with himself during his "To be, or not to be" soliloquy in Act 3 scene 1.  The characters in Act 5 scene 1 approach the topic this time with dark comedy, and in doing so bring up an entirely different theme.

The parody of legal jargon used by the pair of clowns continues the theme of the corruption of politics, as seen in the usurpation of the throne by Claudius (which should have belonged to prince Hamlet) upon King Hamlet's death.

The disintegration of values, morals, and order is a theme discussed at length in "Hamlet".  The colloquial tone of the Gravediggers brings this philosophy into the focus of the audience's world. The synthesis of all perspectives used ends in a greater comprehension of the play as a whole.

Because Hamlet was written in the midst of England's Reformation, the role of religion was a contentious topic. However, Shakespeare was able to address religion and its relationship to suicide through Hamlet, discussing the legality of suicide through characters that have their own intention (i.e. to dig a grave) understood as separate from the author's intention.

Performance 
During the Interregnum, all theatres were closed down by the Puritan government. However, even during this time playlets known as drolls were often performed illegally, including one based on the two clowns, called The Grave-Makers, based on Act 5, Scene 1 of Hamlet.

Film
In most of the movie adaptations of Hamlet, the part of the First Gravedigger (and at times the Second Gravedigger) is played by an extremely established actor or comedian.  The following are the actors that portrayed the Gravedigger in the most notable cinematic productions:

Stanley Holloway in Hamlet (1948), directed by Laurence Olivier
Roger Livesey in Hamlet (1969), directed by Tony Richardson
Trevor Peacock in Hamlet (1990), directed by Franco Zeffirelli
Billy Crystal in Hamlet  (1996), directed by Kenneth Branagh
Jeffrey Wright in Hamlet  (2000), directed by Michael Almereyda
Mark Hadfield in Hamlet  (2009), directed by Gregory Doran

Notes

References

Holland, Peter. 2007. "Shakespeare Abbreviated". In Shaughnessy (2007, 26–45).
Marsden, Jean I. 2002. "Improving Shakespeare: from the Restoration to Garrick". In Wells and Stanton (2002, 21–36).
Shaughnessy, Robert. 2007. The Cambridge Companion to Shakespeare and Popular Culture. Cambridge Companions to Literature ser. Cambridge: Cambridge University Press. 

Male Shakespearean characters
Characters in Hamlet
Fictional Danish people
Literary duos
Comedy theatre characters